The 2016 Buffalo Bills season was the franchise's 57th overall season as a football team, 47th in the National Football League, fourth under leadership of general manager Doug Whaley and second under head coach Rex Ryan. The Bills hoped to improve on their 8–8 record from 2015, the team's first since 2002, but a 34–31 overtime loss to the Miami Dolphins in Week 16 eliminated the Bills from playoff contention for a 17th season in a row, extending the longest active drought among all four North American major professional sports leagues. It would be Ryan's final season as head coach of the team, as he and his brother, Rob, were fired with one game remaining in the regular season.

Offseason

Roster changes

Signings

Free agents lost

Cuts

Retirements

Draft

Pre-Draft 
Prior to the draft, the Bills held visits for 47 players; 8 had previous visits, 23 players visited during the NFL Scouting Combine, 2 at the East–West Shrine Game, 19 had private visits, and 3 had private workouts.

Previously, the Bills traded their 2016 seventh-round selection (240th overall) and their 2015 fifth-round selection (137th overall) to the Minnesota Vikings in exchange for quarterback Matt Cassel and the Vikings' 2015 sixth-round selection (188th overall).

Day-of Activity 

The Bills traded their 2016 second-round pick (49th overall) and fourth-round pick (117th overall) to the Chicago Bears in return for Chicago's 2016 second-round pick (41st overall).

Undrafted free agents
All undrafted free agents were signed after the 2016 NFL draft concluded on April 30 unless otherwise noted.

Staff
On January 10, 2016, one week after the 2015 season ended, Doug Whaley signed a three-year contract extension to remain the Bills general manager. That same day, it was announced that Ryan had hired his twin brother, Rob, to the Bills coaching staff to serve as an assistant head coach and will also work with the defense. Three days later, Ryan hired former NFL standout Ed Reed to be an assistant defensive backs coach.

On January 20, 2016, the Bills promoted Kathryn Smith to special teams quality control coach, making her the first female full-time coach in NFL history. On September 16, 2016, less than 24 hours after losing 37–31 to the New York Jets in their home opener in a game in which the defense failed to stop Jets running back Matt Forte, instead of firing defensive coordinator Dennis Thurman, Ryan pretty much sealed his own fate by firing offensive coordinator Greg Roman and promoting running backs coach Anthony Lynn to the position.

Lynn would later be promoted to interim head coach on December 27, 2016, when the Ryan brothers were fired after the 34–31 overtime loss to the Dolphins eliminated the team from the playoffs.

Staff

Final roster

Schedule

Preseason

Regular season

Note: Intra-division opponents are in bold text.

Game summaries

Week 1: at Baltimore Ravens

Week 2: vs. New York Jets

The Bills saw the return of their red Color Rush uniforms from 2015 in this game. With the loss, not only did the Bills drop to 0–2, but head coach Rex Ryan fired offensive coordinator Greg Roman, promoting running backs coach Anthony Lynn to offensive coordinator the next day. They also lost wide receiver Greg Salas for the season to a groin injury and lost wide receiver Sammy Watkins for several weeks to a foot injury.

Week 3: vs. Arizona Cardinals

With the win, the Bills improved to 1–2 in Lynn's first game as offensive coordinator.

Week 4: at New England Patriots

With the win, not only did the Bills improve to 2–2, but Ryan got his first career regular season victory at Gillette Stadium (he was 0–7 as head coach entering the game, including six straight losses as New York Jets head coach).

Week 5: at Los Angeles Rams

With the win, the Bills improve to 3–2 and their first three-game winning streak since 2011 (the team started that season 3–0).

Week 6: vs. San Francisco 49ers

With the win, the Bills improve to 4–2 and their first four-game winning streak since 2008 (the team started that season 4–0 in Dick Jauron's last full season as head coach).

Week 7: at Miami Dolphins

The Bills led 17–14 by the start of the fourth quarter, but the Dolphins came back to win 28–25, causing the Bills to drop to 4–3.

Week 8: vs. New England Patriots

Week 9: at Seattle Seahawks

With the loss, not only did the Bills drop to 4–5, but they also lost center Eric Wood for the season.

Week 11: at Cincinnati Bengals

With the win, the Bills improved to 5–5, but running back LeSean McCoy, wide receiver Robert Woods and safety Robert Blanton left the game with injuries.

Week 12: vs. Jacksonville Jaguars

With the win, the Bills improved to 6–5, but defensive tackle Corbin Bryant and wide receiver Walt Powell had to miss the rest of the season.

Week 13: at Oakland Raiders

With the loss, the Bills dropped to 6–6.

Week 14: vs. Pittsburgh Steelers

Week 15: vs. Cleveland Browns

With the win, the Bills improved to 7–7 and keep their slim playoff chances alive. The team set a new franchise record for rushing touchdowns in a season (27) with LeSean McCoy's second rushing score of the game. This was also the 400th regular-season win in franchise history.

Week 16: vs. Miami Dolphins

After the Bills took the lead with a touchdown inside the two-minute warning at the end of the fourth quarter, the Dolphins took the game to overtime with a 55-yard field goal with six seconds on the clock. They then secured the win with 47 seconds left in the extra period with another field goal from 27 yards. The loss for the Bills meant they were eliminated from playoff contention for the 17th consecutive season. Two days later, the Bills fired head coach Rex Ryan and assistant head coach Rob Ryan.

Week 17: at New York Jets

Anthony Lynn served as interim head coach, and EJ Manuel made his first start of the season, though he was benched in the 4th quarter as Cardale Jones took over. With the loss, Buffalo ended the season 7–9. This game included a notable flaw on Bills' special teams during a botched kickoff play. Jets' kicker Nick Folk made the ball bounce inside the field, over the heads of Bills' special teamers and into the endzone, only to see the surrounding Bills' players miscommunicate and fail to secure the live ball; Jets' specialist Doug Middleton then fell on the ball inside the endzone, giving New York their last touchdown of the game.

Standings

Division

Conference

References

External links

Buffalo
Buffalo Bills seasons
Buffalo